Tomáš Voráček (born February 27, 1990) is a Czech professional ice hockey defenceman currently playing with HC Sparta Praha in the Czech Extraliga (ELH)

Playing career
Voráček made his senior professional debut with youth club, HC Vítkovice in the Czech Extraliga during the 2006–07 Czech Extraliga season.

In the 2017–18 season, Voráček signed a one-year contract and made his debut in the Russian based, Kontinental Hockey League with HC Slovan Bratislava. After recording just 3 assists in 53 games, Voráček returned to the Czech Extraliga, joining his fourth ELH club, HC Sparta Praha, on January 31, 2018.

References

External links 
 

1990 births
Living people
HC Bílí Tygři Liberec players
BK Mladá Boleslav players
Czech ice hockey defencemen
HC Slovan Bratislava players
HC Sparta Praha players
HC Vítkovice players
Sportspeople from Ostrava
Czech expatriate ice hockey players in Canada
Czech expatriate ice hockey players in Slovakia